Villin-1 is a 92.5 kDa tissue-specific actin-binding protein associated with the actin core bundle of the brush border. Villin-1 is encoded by the VIL1 gene. Villin-1 contains multiple gelsolin-like domains capped by a small (8.5 kDa) "headpiece" at the C-terminus consisting of a fast and independently folding three-helix bundle that is stabilized by hydrophobic interactions. The headpiece domain is a commonly studied protein in molecular dynamics due to its small size and fast folding kinetics and short primary sequence.

Structure 
Villin-1 is made up of seven domains, six homologous domains make up the N-terminal core and the remaining domain makes up the C-terminal cap.  Villin contains three phosphatidylinositol 4,5-biphosphate (PIP2) binding sites, one of which is located at the head piece and the other two in the core.  The core domain is approximately 150 amino acid residues grouped in six repeats.  On this core is an 87 residue, hydrophobic, C-terminal headpiece
The headpiece (HP67) is made up of a compact, 70 amino acid folded protein at the C-terminus.  This headpiece contains an F-actin binding domain.  Residues K38, E39, K65, 70-73:KKEK, G74, L75 and F76 surround a hydrophobic core and are believed to be involved in the binding of F-actin to villin-1.  Residues E39 and K70 form a salt bridge buried within the headpiece which serves to connect N and C terminals.  This salt bridge may also orient and fix the C-terminal residues involved in F-actin binding as in the absence of this salt bridge no binding occurs.  A hydrophobic “cap” is formed by residue W64 side chains, which is completely conserved throughout the villin family.  Below this cap is a crown of alternative positive and negative charged localities.
Villin can undergo post-translational modifications like tyrosine phosphorylation. Villin-1 has the ability to dimerize and the dimerization site is located at the amino end of the protein.

Expression 
Villin-1 is an actin binding protein expressed mainly in the brush border of the epithelium in vertebrates but sometimes it is ubiquitously expressed in protists and plants.  Villin is found localized in the microvilli of the brush border of the epithelium lining of the gut and renal tubules in vertebrates.

Function 
Villin-1 is believed to function in the bundling, nucleation, capping and severing of actin filaments.  In vertebrates, villin proteins help to support the microfilaments of the microvilli of the brush border.  However, knockout mice appear to show ultra-structurally normal microvilli reminding us that the function of villin is not definitively known; it may play a role in cell plasticity through F-actin severing.  The six-repeat villin core is responsible for Ca2+ actin severing while the headpiece is responsible for actin crosslinking and bundling (Ca independent).  Villin is postulated to be the controlling protein for Ca2+ induced actin severing in the brush border.  Ca2+ inhibits proteolytic cleavage of the domains of the 6 N-terminal core which inhibits actin severing.  In normal mice raising Ca2+ levels induces the severing of actin by villin, whereas in villin knockout mice this activity does not occur in response to heightened Ca2+ levels.  In the presence of low concentrations of Ca2+ the villin headpiece functions to bundle actin filaments whereas in the presence of high Ca2+ concentrations the N-terminal caps and severs these filaments.  The association of PIP2 with villin inhibits the actin capping and severing action and increases actin binding at the headpiece region, possibly through structural changes in the protein.  PIP2 increases actin bundling not only by decreasing the severing action of villin but also through dissociating capping proteins, releasing actin monomers from sequestering proteins and stimulating actin nucleation and cross linking.

Villin subdomain 
The C-terminal subdomain of Villin Headpiece VHP67, denoted VHP35, is stabilised  in part, by a buried cluster of three phenylalanine residues. Its small size and high helical content are expected to promote rapid folding, and this has been confirmed experimentally. Villin-4 C-terminal construct VHP76 in Arabidopsis thaliana has been shown to exhibit higher affinity for F-actin in increasing concentrations of Ca2+, which further confirms the function of villin.

Structure 
It has a simple topology consisting of three α-helices that form a well-packed hydrophobic core.

Degradation and regulation 
Currently, it is theorized the regulation of plant villins are caused by degradation via the binding protein auxin, which targets the headpiece domain (VHP).

See also 
 Supervillin

References

Further reading

External links 
 

Proteins